Henry Bate or Hendrik Baten (of Mechelen or of Malines) a.k.a. Henricus Batenus (Mechliniensis) (24 March 1246 in Mechelen – after 1310 in Tongerloo) was a Flemish philosopher, theologian, astronomer, astrologer, poet, and musician.

He was Master of Arts of the University of Paris before 1274. He was a pupil of Thomas Aquinas, he became a canon and cantor of the Cathedral of Saint-Lambert, Liège before 1289.

As astronomer, he made astrolabes, and wrote Magistralis compositio astrolabii, dedicated to his friend William of Moerbeke. He drew up astronomical tables: the Tabule Mechlinenses, from around 1285–1295, and a 1290 work, De erroribus tabularum Alphonsi, which pointed out errors in the Alfonsine tables. While in Rome in 1292, he wrote commentaries on the astrological works of Abraham ibn Ezra and Albumasar.

He became tutor to Guy de Hainaut, brother of Count Jean d'Avesnes, for whom he wrote, between 1285 and 1305, a Speculum divinorum et quorundam naturalium (On the Unity of Natural).

Around 1309, he retired with the Premonstratensians of Tongerloo, where he ended his days.

Notes

References

External links
Benoît Beyer de Ryke: Biography (PDF)  
 BATEN,_Henri (which mentions H.B. of Malines as author of another work (or an otherwise renamed edition) pointing out the errors in the Alphonsine tables)
Biographical and bibliographical notes, in: Alcuin Database of Scholastic Authors, Regensburg. 

1246 births
14th-century deaths
13th-century astronomers
14th-century astronomers
13th-century philosophers
14th-century philosophers
13th-century Latin writers
14th-century Latin writers
People from the Duchy of Brabant
14th-century people of the Holy Roman Empire